Schiappacasse is a surname. Notable people with this surname include: 

 Nicolás Javier Schiappacasse Oliva (born 1999), Uruguayan professional football forward 
 Louis Joseph "Lou" Schiappacasse (1881–1910), nicknamed "Shippy,"  professional baseball player